Adina World Beat Beverages is a manufacturer of coffee, tea and juice drinks based in San Francisco, California. The company was founded in 2004 by Magatte Wade-Marchand, Greg Steltenpohl (one of the co-founders of Odwalla Inc.) and Dominique Leveuf. Adina is led by "an international team of entrepreneurs from Odwalla, SoBe and Peet's Coffee" and has worked to preserve traditional beverage recipes from around the world from "being replaced by cola drinks distributed by multinational corporations".

Adina manufactures the drinks from "sustainable" ingredients obtained through fair trade and sourced from small-scale farmers in places like India, Guatemala, Indonesia, and Ethiopia. The company says it works to aid to impoverished farmers.

Origin

Magatte Wade-Marchand came up with the idea to found a beverage company when she visited her native Senegal and found that cola had replaced traditional hibiscus drinks. Worried that the drinks and the heritage would be lost, Wade-Marchand approached Greg Steltenpohl, who had recently left as head of Odwalla Inc., and asked for help to begin a company. He agreed, and, with his wife, Dominique Leveuf, the three began the company. Adina for Life is headquartered at 660 York Street in San Francisco, California. To fund the start-up, the founders contributed heavily; in addition, the trio raised $5 million in investments in early years.

The company sells a variety of beverages based on drinks from around the world in 14 fluid ounce bottles, mainly to the San Francisco Bay Area. However, the company is promoting their products in large cities throughout the United States like New York City and Austin, Texas.

Partnerships
Adina is partnered with several organizations that share their goals, including Agribusiness in Sustainable Natural African Plant Products (ASNAPP), which works to reduce poverty in Africa; Association Education Santé (AES), which works to help hibiscus farmers in the global market; the ECO-AGRI Research Foundation, a non-profit organization centered in India seeking to improve the lives of rural farmers; as well as other co-ops and financers in third-world countries.

Products
Adina's natural beverages span four product lines:
 Adina Organic Blends, an organic Fair Trade line of exotic gourmet coffees and tea launched in late 2007
 Adina Miracle Fruits Fortified Juice Drinks launched in 2006
 Adina Organic Juice Coolers launched in 2005. For
Adina launched its Natural Highs fair trade certified all natural cold-brewed coffee energy drink in October 2008. The drinks are sold at Whole Foods Market and come in various flavors such as mocha, hazelnut and double espresso.

References

 

Manufacturing companies based in San Francisco
Food and drink companies based in San Francisco
Cuisine of the Western United States
Drink companies based in California